Eurranthis is a monotypic moth genus in the family Geometridae erected by Jacob Hübner in 1823. Its only species, Eurranthis plummistaria, was first described by Charles Joseph Devillers in 1789. It is found in south-western Europe, including the Maritime Alps in France and Italy and the Iberian Peninsula.

The wingspan is 30–32 mm. It is a day-flying species.

Larvae feed on Dorycnium species.

Subspecies
 Eurranthis plummistaria plummistaria
 Eurranthis plummistaria atlanticaria Le Cerf, 1923 (North Africa)

References

External links

Fauna Europaea
Moths and Butterflies of Europe and North Africa
Lepiforum e.V.

Boarmiini
Moths of Europe
Taxa named by Charles Joseph Devillers
Monotypic moth genera